Hot Dogs for Gauguin (1972) is a short film written and directed by Martin Brest, then a film student at New York University. The short film features Danny DeVito and Rhea Perlman in her acting debut.

Plot
In this short film, DeVito plays a photographer who is determined to capture visual magic and fame. He concocts an intricate plot to explode the Statue of Liberty and sets his camera to record the Statue of Liberty's explosion as it was broken into pieces. It was filmed in New York City in black and white on 16 mm film. Rhea Perlman played the woman on a ferry, while Martin Brest played the man on a ferry. The scene of the Statue of Liberty's head exploding was incorporated during the final scene. Brest and Randolph Herr are credited with doing the special effects. This short film was inspired by the Hindenburg disaster on May 6, 1937.

Reception
In 2009, it was one of 25 films selected for the National Film Registry by the Library of Congress to "be preserved as cultural, artistic and/or historical treasures."

See also
 List of American films of 1972
 Statue of Liberty
 Hindenburg disaster

References

External links

Hot Dogs for Gauguin essay by Daniel Eagan In America's Film Legacy, 2009-2010: A Viewer's Guide To The 50 Landmark Movies Added To The National Film Registry In 2009-10, Bloomsbury Publishing USA, 2011,  pages 135-138 
Saturday Night Live: Hot Dogs for Gauguin – Three-minute version aired in 1980

1972 films
1972 independent films
1972 short films
American independent films
1970s English-language films
Films about photographers
Films directed by Martin Brest
United States National Film Registry films
1970s American films